The broadmouth catshark (Apristurus macrostomus) is a rare catshark of the family Scyliorhinidae, the holotype and only specimen of which was taken from off Zhujiang in the South China Sea, at a depth of 913 m. Its length is around 38 cm. The broadmouth catshark's reproduction is oviparous. Considering the species is not well known, the threats are not known either but may be deepwater fisheries.

References 

 
 Apristurus macrostomus   Chu, Meng & Li, 1985 

broadmouth catshark
Marine fish of Southeast Asia
South China Sea
Taxa named by Meng Qing-Wen
Taxa named by Chu Yuan-Ting
Taxa named by Li Sheng (ichthyologist)
broadmouth catshark